TEV İnanç Türkeş High School for Gifted Students is an independent private co-educational boarding school for the gifted and talented in Turkey.

History

In 1990 Sezai Türkeş founded the İnanç Foundation  (İnanç Vakfi) in his late wife İnanç Türkeş’s name.  The foundation aimed to educate underprivileged gifted and talented Turkish students and started Özel İnanç Lisesi in 1993 with 30 students.  In its full capacity, the school planned to have 210 students in 7 grades (prep year, followed by 3 years of middle school and 3 years of high school).

Starting in 1995, the school experienced financial problems and opted to stop the construction of its campus.

In 1997, due to changes in the education system of Turkey, Özel İnanç Lisesi dropped the middle school section.

In 2002, due to further financial hardship, the administration of Özel İnanç Lisesi was handed over to Türk Eğitim Vakfı which renamed it TEV İnanç Türkeş Özel Lisesi.

Admission and Fees

Student Selection Process
Admission to the school was based on aptitude and the school administers its own testing and admission process. Admission was done through a rigorous selection procedure involving three steps:

 Application and Aptitude Test: At the end of their 8th grade, the ~2000 students who apply to the school were given an aptitude test for cognitive assessment in various cities throughout Turkey. Exams were taken in several major centers. While the school was striving to receive applications from all regions in Turkey the majority of applicants were from the Western half of Turkey.
 Second Screening: Students who succeed on this test were given an IQ test (WISC); the 120 top-scoring students were invited to TEVİTOL for further examination.
 Summer Camp: These 120 students attended a 5-day summer camp at TEVITOL for observation and interviews. The camp involved a full-day schedule that began with sports in the morning and continued up to 18:00 with fifty-minute classes. The program also included drama, music, and social activities in the evening. Students stayed in the school dormitories. Part of the evaluation involved seeing if applicants would be fit for a boarding school experience and how they would interact with other fellow students.
 Admission: After the summer camp, 60 students were admitted with scholarship or financial aid awarded as necessary. Since 2006, generally 25% of students received full scholarship while a significant number was also granted partial aid.

During the transition period from the Inanc Turkes Foundation to the Turkish Education Foundation, different methods were used to replace some of these stages but since 2007 the above procedure had become the norm again until recent years.

As of 2021-22, the selection procedure of TEVITOL consists of two main steps. Students designated to graduate from the 8th-grade pre-apply in mid-March. For the completion of their pre-application, students are expected to provide their high school entrance exam (LGS) scores. The applicants are ranked according to their LGS scores, and then invited to the campus for the completion of the second step of the selection process.

First, Cognitive Assessment System test is applied in order to determine students' cognitive skills in planning, attention span, simultaneous, and successive subsets (90 min). Then, students are interviewed on their educational history and achievements (30 min). Although not included in the overall score for admission, there is also a placement test of English (60 min). Finally, if they apply, students' parents are interviewed for determining the scholarship/financial aid.

Fees and Financial Aid
The full cost of studying at TEVITOL is  135.500 TRY (~16.000 USD) for boarding students and 90.000 TRY for non-boarding students (2021-2022).

Initially, İnanç High School awarded full scholarship to all admitted students. One of the requirements of entry was financial need because the school aimed to admit underprivileged students. Representatives from the school visited students at their homes to identify students who are really in need. This step was more of a subjective financial background check and it also provided the family of the student to meet representatives from the school to answer any questions they may have. Currently, financial background information is only required of full scholarship candidates and those seeking partial aid and involves parents financial statements.

Extracurriculars and Traditional activities

Extracurricular activities

TEV İnanç High School offers activities to improve students' creativity and social life. All students are encouraged to have at least three weekly activities, but students may have more than three (most do). Activities in the school can be student-run, teacher-run or could take place outside the school in cooperation with universities and academic institutions. Popular student-run activities include:

puzzle
A Capella group D'Acca
Russian Club
Design Club
Drumm
Athletics
Debate Club
Economics Club
MUN (Model United Nations)
JA (Junior Achievement)
Nota Bene the English newspaper
Ayaküstü the literary review
Green Team
Comenius*
Philosophy Club
Mechatronics Club
Theater Club 
Astronomy Club

are activities with teacher participation.

Traditional activities

Fairytale Night
Poetry Night
Quiz Night
History Night
Inter-High Schools Debate Competition
Science and Arts Week

Campus

TEV İnanç Türkeş High School is located 7 km southeast of Gebze. The campus consists of 103 acres (420,000 m2) of land and houses administrative offices, staff housing and sports facilities.

On a west-east axis, the school contains student housing, arts center, library, main building with student lounges and dining hall, science center and athletics facilities. To the north of the campus, there is an indoor sports complex.

To the southwest of the main campus, the "Greek Temple" (an observation site) sits atop stairs that lead down to the Sea of Marmara.

TUBITAK is adjacent to the campus to the west.

College Admissions

Universities Abroad
TEVITOL has been sending applications to universities both in Turkey and abroad since 2000 with the first graduates of the class. Particularly in its initial years, İnanç High School students were able to study with full scholarship.

Some of the universities Inanc alumni have been admitted to:

Amherst College
Oberlin College
Carleton College
Smith College
Bryn Mawr College
Lehigh University
Brown University
New York University
M.I.T.
Caltech
Georgia Tech
Mount Holyoke College
Carleton College
Macalester College
Sarah Lawrence College
Columbia University
St. Lawrence University
Connecticut College
St. Olaf College
Drexel University
Swarthmore College
Duke University
University of Chicago
Grinnell College
Wellesley College
Hamilton College
Wesleyan University
Jacobs University Bremen
Yale University
Minerva Schools at KGI
Middlebury College
Harvard University
Bocconi University
Stanford University
Princeton University
Northwestern University
Cornell University
Williams College

References

External links
Official Website

High schools in Turkey
Private schools in Turkey
Educational institutions established in 1993
1993 establishments in Turkey
Gebze